The JŽ series 611 is a historic vehicle of Yugoslav Railways. It was a diesel-electric multiple unit made from aluminium alloy. It was nicknamed the "Aluminium train". A total of 3 units were made.

The first examples had a weak engine, but later models had a stronger one. They performed very well on level lines, but on mountain railways they suffered some damage.

History
 Service start: 1965/09/28
 Last year of service: 1974

External links
611 at railfaneurope.net

Multiple units of Yugoslavia

Train-related introductions in 1965